Connor Roe Maguire may refer to:
 Connor Roe Maguire (died 1625), Irish Gaelic chief of Magherastephana, County Fermanagh
 Connor Maguire, 2nd Baron of Enniskillen, grandson of the above